Shepody (formerly Chipoudy) is a small community in Southeastern New Brunswick on Route 114. It was founded as an Acadian village in 1698 and destroyed in 1755. The current settlement has a population of approximately 20, and is located just off the coast of Shepody Bay.

History

By 1701, poitevin Pierre Thibaudeau and members of his family (four sons and a friend) moved from Port Royal to Shepody, inaugurating another cluster of Acadian settlements there and on the Petitcodiac River. After that, his friend, Guillaume Blanchard and his two sons, founded and established themselves in Petitcodiac.

In August 1755, British Army Lieutenant Colonel Robert Monckton sent Captain Sylvanus Cobb to deport the population of Chipoudy.  The English soldiers were sent to Beaubassin, Petitcodiac, Chipoudy, and Memramcook to take the Acadians prisoners.  However, through guidance by the local missionary, Father LeGuerne, the Acadians hid in the woods.  Then, on 26 August, Lieutenant Boishébert of Miramichi and 125 soldiers and a group of Micmacs, surprised 200 Englishmen, under the command of Major Joseph Frye.  The English had set fire to the church of Chipoudy and 181 homes, as well as 250 houses in Petitcodiac.  Boishébert gave the order to attack at the moment that the English were setting fire to the church of Petitcodiac.  After three hours of fierce fighting, the English retreated, leaving behind 50 dead, and around 60 wounded.  It was thus that 200 families were able to escape the deportation.

Geography
The former village was situated on the west side of Shepody Bay, at the foot of Caledonian Hills, in the region where the ground is low, the Chipody marshes.  It was part of most of the region of Trois-Rivières.  The main water supply is the Chipoudy river.  The village corresponds to approximately the territory that lies between Mary's Point and cap des Demoiselles, which is now in the Albert county, south-east of New Brunswick.

Notable people

See also
List of communities in New Brunswick

References

Communities in Albert County, New Brunswick
Acadian history
Former municipalities in New Brunswick
Tourist attractions in Albert County, New Brunswick